Abdul Mukti Ali (born in Cepu, Blora, Central Java, Dutch East Indies, August 23, 1923 - died in Yogyakarta, Indonesia, May 5, 2004 at the age of 80 years) was a Minister of Religious Affairs of the Republic of Indonesia in the Second Development Cabinet.

Government ministers of Indonesia
People from Blora Regency
1923 births
2004 deaths
Javanese people